Linda S. Wilson (born 1936) is an American academic administrator.

Early life 
In 1936, Wilson was born in Washington, D.C.

Education 
Wilson received an A.B. with honors from H. Sophie Newcomb Memorial College at Tulane University (1957), and went on to receive a Ph.D in Chemistry from the University of Wisconsin-Madison (1962). She, also, received an Honorary Doctorate in Humane Letters from Newcomb College at Tulane University and an Honorary Doctorate of Letters from the University of Maryland.

Career 
Between 1964 and 1969, Wilson was a researcher and teacher at the University of Maryland, University of Southampton (England), and the University of Missouri.
Wilson became a university administrator at Washington University in St. Louis (1969-1974), and the University of Illinois, Urbana-Champaign (1975-1985). From 1985-1989, Wilson was vice president for research at the University of Michigan.

Wilson served as President of Radcliffe College from 1989 to 1999. She started several programs during her tenure as president. In 1991, she initiated the Radcliffe Research Partnership Program to foster undergraduate research opportunities. In 1993, she began the Radcliffe Public Policy Institute to encourage interdisciplinary research between scholars, policymakers, business and labor leaders, and members of the media. In 1993, Wilson, along with faculty members at Radcliffe College and six other Boston institutions, helped to start the Graduate Consortium in Women’s Studies to further advance scholarship in women's studies. After Harvard University and Radcliffe agreed to merge and created the Radcliffe Institute for Advanced Study in 1999, Wilson ended her tenure as president.

Wilson acted as an advisor to the United States Department of Energy and the National Research Council. She also served as a director for Internet Corporation for Assigned Names and Numbers(ICANN) from October 1998 until 26 June 2003.

She is a Trustee of the Committee on Economic Development, a Director of Myriad Genetics, Inc. and Inacom, Inc., and Honorary Trustee of the Massachusetts General Hospital, a member of the Board of Visitors for the University of Wisconsin College of Letters and Science, and a member of the Dean's Advisory Council of Newcomb College.

Wilson is a member of Phi Beta Kappa, Sigma Xi, and was a fellow of the American Association for the Advancement of Science. In addition, she is a member of the Institute of Medicine of the National Academy of Science, and the Research Roundtable of the National Academy of Sciences.

Personal life
Wilson is married, and has two children.

References

External links
Papers, 1990-1998. Schlesinger Library, Radcliffe Institute, Harvard University.
FLAWLESS CREDENTIALS ONLY ONE SIDE OF RADCLIFFE'S NEW LEADER
Linda Wilson ICANNwiki.

Living people
1936 births
University of Michigan faculty
University of Wisconsin–Madison College of Letters and Science alumni
Presidents of Radcliffe College
H. Sophie Newcomb Memorial College alumni
Members of the National Academy of Medicine
Tulane University alumni
University System of Maryland faculty
University of Missouri faculty
Washington University in St. Louis people